The 27th District of the Iowa Senate is located in northern Iowa, and is currently composed of Butler, Cerro Gordo, and Franklin Counties.

Current elected officials
Amanda Ragan is the senator currently representing the 27th District.

The area of the 27th District contains two Iowa House of Representatives districts:
The 53rd District (represented by Sharon Steckman)
The 54th District (represented by Shannon Latham)

The district is also located in Iowa's 4th congressional district, which is represented by Randy Feenstra.

Past senators
The district has previously been represented by:

Joe Brown, 1983–1986
Richard Varn, 1987–1992
Wally Horn, 1993–2002
Ron Wieck, 2003–2010
Bill Anderson, 2011–2012
Amanda Ragan, 2013–present

See also
Iowa General Assembly
Iowa Senate

References

27